Nicholas Thomas "Ned" Richardson (26 May 1886 – 19 January 1929) was an Australian rules footballer who played with Fitzroy, Richmond and Essendon in the Victorian Football League (VFL).

Richardson, a half back from Beverley, had two stints in the VFL. He started out at Fitzroy but could only manage two appearances. When he returned to the league in 1913, at Richmond, he immediately became a regular member of the side, with 16 games for the year. He switched clubs during the 1915 VFL season but then had to sit out of league football for two years, as Essendon went into a war imposed recess. He resumed at Essendon in 1918 and was one of only two players from his club to appear in all 14 rounds.

Richardson also had a noted professional running career, specialising in middle distance events.

References

1886 births
Australian rules footballers from Victoria (Australia)
Fitzroy Football Club players
Richmond Football Club players
Essendon Football Club players
1929 deaths